State parliaments are legislative bodies of subnational bodies usually referred to in English as "states". It may refer to:

 Landtag in German-speaking countries
 Parliaments of the Australian states and territories